Repno is a small settlement in the Municipality of Šentjur, eastern Slovenia. Repno lies northwest of the town of Šentjur. The settlement, and the entire municipality, are included in the Savinja Statistical Region, which is in the Slovenian portion of the historical Duchy of Styria.

References

External links

Repno at Geopedia

Populated places in the Municipality of Šentjur